Yakan may refer to:
 Yakan people, a community of the Philippines
 Yakan language, a language of the Philippines
 Cape Yakan, in Russia

People with the name 
 Adly Yakan Pasha (1864–1933), Egyptian politician
 Fathi Yakan (1933–2009), Lebanese cleric and politician
 Hesham Yakan (born 1962), Egyptian football player
 Ibrahim Yakan (1900–?), Egyptian football player
 Tuba Yakan (born 1991), Turkish martial artist

See also 
 Iacan
 Yagan (disambiguation)
 Yaghan (disambiguation)
 Yaka (disambiguation)
 Yekan (disambiguation)

Language and nationality disambiguation pages